Aida Nuno Palacio (born 24 November 1983) is a Spanish road racing and cyclo-cross cyclist, who currently rides for UCI Women's Continental Team . She represented her nation in the women's elite event at the 2016 UCI Cyclo-cross World Championships  in Heusden-Zolder.

References

External links

 

1983 births
Living people
Cyclo-cross cyclists
Spanish female cyclists
Place of birth missing (living people)
People from Siero
Cyclists from Asturias
21st-century Spanish women